The Swiss pavilion houses Switzerland's national representation during the Venice Biennale arts festivals.

Background

Organization and building 

The Swiss pavilion was designed by Swiss architect Bruno Giacometti as part of a design competition and was constructed in 1952. It has multiple rooms linked by courtyards.

Between 1990 and 2009, Switzerland also used the San Stae church as exhibition venue. From 1932 until 1952 Switzerland had another pavilion, designed by Brenno Del Giudice on the island Sant'Elena.

As of 2012, Pro Helvetia has assumed responsibility for the Swiss contributions to the Venice Biennale.

Representation by year

Art 

 1920 — Group exhibition
 1926 — Group exhibition
 1932 — Paul Bodmer, Numa Donzé, Augusto Giacometti, Karl Otto Hügin, Reinhold Kündig, Martin Lauterburg, Ernst Morgenthaler, Alfred Heinrich Pellegrini, Karl Geiser, Hermann Haller, Hermann Hubacher, Johann Jakob Probst, René Auberjonois, Maurice Barraud, Hans Berger, Abraham Hermanjat, Albert Carl Angst
 1934 — Cuno Amiet, Hermann Haller
 1936 — Aldo Patocchi, Emilio Maria Beretta, Max Uehlinger
 1938 — Victor Surbek, Hermann Hubacher, Hans Berger
 1940 — Louis René Moilliet, Johann Jakob Probst, Alexandre Blanchet
 1942 — Karl Walser, Otto Charles Bänninger, Max Hunziker
 1948 — Fritz Pauli, Franz Fischer, René Auberjonois, Albert Schnyder
 1950 — Alfred Heinrich Pellegrini, Ernst Suter
 1952 — Hans Fischer, Max Gubler, Johann Jakob Probst
 1954 — Cuno Amiet, Carl Burckhardt, Paul Speck, Marcel Poncet
 1956 — Hans Aeschbacher, Walter Bodmer, Johannes Burla, Eugen Häfelfinger, Walter Linck, Bernhard Luginbühl, Robert Müller, Erwin Rehmann, Sophie Taeuber-Arp, Louis Weber, André Gigon, Hansjörg Gisiger, René Monney, Antoine Poncet, Léon Prébandier, André Ramseyer, Serge Brignoni
 1958 — Max Bill, Richard Paul Lohse, Camille Graeser, Theodor Bally, Wolf Barth, Walter Bodmer, Theo Eble, Fritz Glarner, Leo Leuppi, Louis René Moilliet, Wilfrid Moser, Max Rudolf von Mühlenen
 1960 — Otto Tschumi, Varlin, Robert Müller
 1962 — Albert Schilling, Paul Speck, Louis René Moilliet
 1964 — Zoltán Kemény, Bernhard Luginbühl
 1966 — Johannes Itten, Walter Linck
 1968 — Fritz Glarner, Hans Aeschbacher
 1970 — Peter Stämpfli, Walter Vögeli, Jean-Edouard Augsburger
 1972 — Richard Paul Lohse, Willy Weber
 1976 — Max Altorfer, Claude Loewer
 1978 — Raffael Benazzi, Roland Hotz, Jean Lecoultre
 1980 — Peter Steiner, Wilfrid Moser, Oscar Wiggli
 1982 — Dieter Roth
 1984 — Miriam Cahn
 1986 — John Armleder, Aldo Walker
 1988 — Markus Raetz
 1990 — Olivier Mosset
 1993 — Christoph Rütimann
 1995 — Peter Fischli & David Weiss
 1997 — Urs Frei, Helmut Federle
 1999 — Roman Signer
 2001 — Urs Luthi, Norbert Möslang, Andy Guhl
 2003 — Emmanuelle Antille, Gerda Steiner, Jörg Lenzlinger
 2005 — Pipilotti Rist, Ingrid Wildi, Gianni Motti, Shahryar Nashat, Marco Poloni (curator: Stefan Banz)
 2007 — Yves Netzhammer, Ugo Rondinone, Urs Fischer, Christine Streuli (curators: Urs Staub, Andreas Münch)
 2009 — Silvia Bächli, Fabrice Gygi (Commissioner: Andreas Münch, Curator: Urs Staub)
 2011 — Thomas Hirschhorn/"Chewing the Scenery" (Curator: Andrea Thal)
 2013 — Valentin Carron (Curator: Giovanni Carmine)
 2015 — Pamela Rosenkranz (Curator: Susanne Pfeffer)
 2017 — Carol Bove, Teresa Hubbard / Alexander Birchler (Curator: Philipp Kaiser)
 2019 — Pauline Boudry / Renate Lorenz (Curator: Charlotte Laubard)
 2022 — Latifa Echakhch, Alexandre Babel (Curator: Francesco Stocchi)
 2024 — Guerreiro do Divino Amor (Curator: Andrea Bellini)

References

Bibliography

External links 

 
 Swiss Institute for Art Research reference overview of Swiss participation

National pavilions
Swiss art